M. Sellamuthu is an Indian politician and former Member of the Legislative Assembly of Tamil Nadu. He was elected to the Tamil Nadu legislative assembly as a Communist Party of India (Marxist) candidate from Tiruvarur constituency in 1980 and 1984 elections.1984 Tamil Nadu Election Results, Election Commission of India

References 

Communist Party of India (Marxist) politicians from Tamil Nadu
Living people
Year of birth missing (living people)
Tamil Nadu MLAs 1985–1989